Kallichore , also known as , is a natural satellite of Jupiter. It was discovered by a team of astronomers from the University of Hawaii led by Scott S. Sheppard in 2003. It received the temporary designation .

Kallichore is about 2 kilometres in diameter, and orbits Jupiter at an average distance of 23,112,000 km in 717.806 days, at an inclination of 165° to the ecliptic (164° to Jupiter's equator), in a retrograde direction and with an eccentricity of 0.2042.

It was named in March 2005 after the nymph Kallichore.

Kallichore belongs to the Carme group, made up of irregular retrograde moons orbiting Jupiter at a distance ranging between 23 and 24 Gm and at an inclination of about 165°.

References

Carme group
Moons of Jupiter
Irregular satellites
Discoveries by Scott S. Sheppard
Astronomical objects discovered in 2003
Moons with a retrograde orbit